Jay Mulucha is an LGBTQI activist from Uganda and a basketball player of the Magic Stormers, a team participating in the Federation of Uganda Basketball League (FUBA). Jay Mulucha is one of the managers of the team.

Biography 
He started to play basketball when he was a teenager.

He nearly died after being attacked in a rally for LGBTQI rights. On the verge of suicide, he decided he would engage himself to campaign for LGBTIQ rights in his homeland.
He became the Pride Uganda coordinator and participated in the first Pride Festival in 2012. He became president of Fem Alliance Uganda. Fem Alliance has focused on computer training programs and economic empowering projects to create more opportunities for the LGBT community residing in Uganda.

References

Living people
Ugandan men's basketball players
Ugandan LGBT rights activists
Year of birth missing (living people)
Transgender sportspeople